In mathematical analysis, the final value theorem (FVT) is one of several similar theorems used to relate frequency domain expressions to the time domain behavior as time approaches infinity.
Mathematically, if  in continuous time has (unilateral) Laplace transform , then a final value theorem establishes conditions under which

Likewise, if  in discrete time has (unilateral) Z-transform , then a final value theorem establishes conditions under which

(see Abelian and Tauberian theorems for integral transforms).

Final value theorems for the Laplace transform

Deducing  

In the following statements, the notation '' means that  approaches 0, whereas '' means that  approaches 0 through the positive numbers.

Standard Final Value Theorem 

Final Value Theorem using Laplace transform of the derivative 

Suppose that  and  both have Laplace transforms that exist for all . If  exists and  exists then .

Remark

Both limits must exist for the theorem to hold. For example, if  then  does not exist, but 
.

Improved Tauberian converse Final Value Theorem 

Suppose that  is bounded and differentiable, and that
If  as  then .

Extended Final Value Theorem 

Then one of the following occurs:
In particular, if  is a multiple pole of  then case 2 or 3 applies ( or ).

Generalized Final Value Theorem 

Suppose that  is Laplace transformable. Let . If  exists and  exists then

where  denotes the Gamma function.

Applications 

Final value theorems for obtaining  have applications in establishing the long-term stability of a system.

Deducing

Abelian Final Value Theorem 

Elementary proof

Let , and choose  so that  for all . Since , for every  we have

hence

Now for every  we have 
.
On the other hand, since  is fixed it is clear that , and so  if  is small enough.

Final Value Theorem using Laplace transform of the derivative 

Suppose that all of the following conditions are satisfied:
  is continuously differentiable and both  and  have a Laplace transform
  is absolutely integrable - that is,  is finite
  exists and is finite
Then
.

Remark

The proof uses the dominated convergence theorem.

Final Value Theorem for the mean of a function 

Let  be a continuous and bounded function such that such that the following limit exists

Then .

Final Value Theorem for asymptotic sums of periodic functions 

Suppose further that  is asymptotically equal to a finite sum of periodic functions , that is

Then
.

Final Value Theorem for a function that diverges to infinity 

Suppose that  satisfies all of the following conditions:
  is infinitely differentiable at zero
  has a Laplace transform for all non-negative integers  
  diverges to infinity as 

Final Value Theorem for improperly integrable functions (Abel's theorem for integrals) 

Then

This is a version of Abel's theorem.

To see this, notice that  and apply the final value theorem to  after an integration by parts: For ,

To establish the convergence of the improper integral  in practice, Dirichlet's test for improper integrals is often helpful. An example is the Dirichlet integral.

Applications 

Final value theorems for obtaining  have applications in probability and statistics to calculate the moments of a random variable. Then the -th moment of  can be calculated as

The strategy is to write
 
where  is continuous and 
for each ,  for a function .
, and apply a final value theorem to deduce 
.  Then
 
and hence  is obtained.

Examples

Example where FVT holds 

For example, for a system described by transfer function

and so the impulse response converges to

That is, the system returns to zero after being disturbed by a short impulse. However, the Laplace transform of the unit step response is

and so the step response converges to

and so a zero-state system will follow an exponential rise to a final value of 3.

Example where FVT does not hold 

For a system described by the transfer function

the final value theorem appears to predict the final value of the impulse response to be 0 and the final value of the step response to be 1. However, neither time-domain limit exists, and so the final value theorem predictions are not valid. In fact, both the impulse response and step response oscillate, and (in this special case) the final value theorem describes the average values around which the responses oscillate.

There are two checks performed in Control theory which confirm valid results for the Final Value Theorem:
 All non-zero roots of the denominator of  must have negative real parts.
  must not have more than one pole at the origin.

Final value theorems for the Z transform

Deducing

Final Value Theorem 

If  exists and  exists then .

Final value of linear systems

Continuous-time LTI systems 
Final value of the system

in response to a step input  with amplitude  is:

Sampled-data systems 

The sampled-data system of the above continuous-time LTI system at the aperiodic sampling times  is the discrete-time system

where  and
,  
The final value of this system in response to a step input  with amplitude  is the same as the final value of its original continuous-time system.

See also
 Initial value theorem
 Z-transform
 Laplace Transform
Abelian and Tauberian theorems

Notes

External links
https://web.archive.org/web/20101225034508/http://wikis.controltheorypro.com/index.php?title=Final_Value_Theorem
http://fourier.eng.hmc.edu/e102/lectures/Laplace_Transform/node17.html : final value for Laplace
https://web.archive.org/web/20110719222313/http://www.engr.iupui.edu/~skoskie/ECE595s7/handouts/fvt_proof.pdf: final value proof for Z-transforms

Theorems in Fourier analysis
it:Teorema del valore iniziale